Lamar Russ (born January 15, 1987) is an American professional boxer.

Amateur career
Lamar is a six time North Carolina State champion and was ranked fifth in the nation during his amateur career.

Professional career
On December 17, 2010 Russ upset former Haitian Olympian Elie Augustama. This bout was held at the UIC Pavilion in Chicago.

Russ suffered his first professional defeat in a bout against Matthew Macklin on December 7, 2013 

Russ suffered his fourth loss in a bout against Aidan Werner on January 2, due to a doctor stoppage.

Personal life
Russ graduated from Fayetteville State University with a degree in Business Administration in 2011. His nickname, "The Boxing Que," references his membership in the Omega Psi Phi fraternity as its members are known as "Ques."

References

External links

Boxers from North Carolina
Boxers from Florida
Sportspeople from Tallahassee, Florida
Middleweight boxers
1987 births
Living people
American male boxers
African-American boxers
21st-century African-American sportspeople
20th-century African-American people